This is a list of detective fiction writers.  Many of these authors may also overlap with authors of crime fiction, mystery fiction, or thriller fiction.

A–C

D–H

I–M

N–S

Sherlock holmes

T–Y

See also
Detective fiction
List of crime writers
List of mystery writers
List of authors
List of female detective/mystery writers

External resources
Classic Crime fiction Resource site for collectors of detective fiction

Detective fiction